The BSA A65 is a custom-built racing sidecar, specifically designed and developed to compete in the F.I.M. Sidecar World Championship, between 1965 and 1973, and built between 1965 and 1966. It was powered by a  engine from the BSA Spitfire.

References 

BSA motorcycles
Grand Prix motorcycles
Sidecar racing